The West New York Burns Club were a professional soccer club from New York which played in the National Association Football League. After finishing 8th in 1907 the team withdrew and reverted to amateur status.

Defunct soccer clubs in New York (state)
Men's soccer clubs in New York (state)
National Association Football League teams